Janardhana Swamy served as a Member of Parliament in 15th Lok Sabha (2009-2014) representing the Chitradurga Lok Sabha Constituency in the Parliament of India.

Early life and education

Janardhana Swamy is the only son for his father Venkatappa and mother Chinnadevi. His father Venkatappa was a primary school teacher in Karnataka, India. He holds a Bachelor's degree in Engineering (Instrumentation Technology) from U.B.D.T. College of Engineering, Davangere, under University of Mysore and a Master's degree in Engineering (Electrical Communication) from the Indian Institute of Science (IISc), Bangalore.

Career
Swamy worked in various engineering and management positions at Cisco, Dell, Sasken, Cadence Design Systems, and Sun Microsystems. His research articles appeared in IEEE, IETE, and other publications, and he obtained a United States Patent US 6,686,759 for "Testing embedded cores in multi-core integrated circuit designs" on Feb. 3, 2004.

He also worked as a full-time party worker of Bharatiya Janata Party (BJP) and served as the first president of BJP IT Cell (Karnataka Division).

He contested and won the 2009 Lok Sabha election from Chitradurga, Karnataka. As a Member of Parliament Swamy, along with Davangere MP GM Siddeshwara and Tumkur MP GS Basavaraju, were instrumental in sanctioning the direct Railway connection between Chitradurga and the state's capital Bangalore. He also played significant roles in setting up the DRDO, BARC, ISRO, and IISc's new campus at Challakere.

He lost the Lok Sabha election from Chitragurga in 2014.

Literary works
He designed and illustrated cover pages for several books and publications. While he was in United States, he worked as the Chief Editor & Vice-President of California's Kannada community organisation KKNC. His cartoons appeared in state, national and international publications and newspapers in India.

Other Roles
In 15th Lok Sabha:
 Member of Committee on External Affairs
 Member of Council of Indian Institutes of Technology (IIT), which is headed by the President of India
 Member of Committee on Agriculture, Consumer Affairs, Food & Public Distribution
 Member of Technology Committee at Lok Sabha

He is presently holding the following positions:
 Member of Karnataka State Innovation Council
 Member of Indian Institute of Cartoonists

References

1968 births
Kannada people
Living people
Indian Hindus
People from Chitradurga
India MPs 2009–2014
Artists from Karnataka
Indian cartoonists
Lok Sabha members from Karnataka
National Democratic Alliance candidates in the 2014 Indian general election
Bharatiya Janata Party politicians from Karnataka
Indian Institute of Science alumni